SS Wyola was a  steam tug built in 1912 by JT Eltringham & Co of South Shields, England for the Swan River Shipping Company of Western Australia. She was also fitted with a powerful salvage pump, making her one of the most powerful tugs in Australia at that time.

While being delivered to Fremantle, Wyola was sent to rescue the barque Concordia, which had been grounded by a cyclone that hit Depuch Island in early 1912.

On 13 June 1920 Wyola sailed from Fremantle Harbour into a storm to rescue the steamship Kingsmere, which had lost her rudder while crossing the Great Australian Bight.

On 5 January 1921 Wyola arrived in Carnarvon, WA to rescue the State Shipping Service of Western Australia steamship , which was on fire. The tug's crew sank Kwinana in shallow water at her moorings to extinguish the fire, and then raised her by pumping her out with the tug's pump.

In 1933 Wyola underwent repairs on the Fremantle slips, when some of her plates were so worn that a hole was accidentally knocked through one.

In 1970 Wyola was dismantled at Robb Jetty, south of Fremantle. Her remains are buried in the sand at CY O'Connor Beach in North Coogee, with some of her stern still visible.

References

External links
 

1912 ships
Iron and steel steamships of Australia
Tugboats of Australia
Ships built on the River Tyne
State Register of Heritage Places in the City of Cockburn